Christian Pattikawa (1 October 1940 – 1 January 2020) was an Indonesian film director and producer. 

Pattikawa was born in Ambon. In 1974, he led the film company P.T. Aurea Aristo Film. Actress Rina Hassim was his wife. They had a two daughter, singer Jean Pattikawa (born 30 June 1970) and Yulia Pattikawa (born 1971). Chris was a contemporary of composer Enteng Tanamal and directors Nico Pelamonia and Jopijaya Burnama.

Death

He died in Jakarta on 1 January 2020, at the age of 79. He was buried few days later at Pondok Ranggon Cemetery.

Filmography
Jangan Biarkan Mereka Lapar - 1974
Kasih Sayang - 1974
Impian Perawan - 1976
Cinta Bersemi - 1977

References

1940 births
2020 deaths
People from Ambon, Maluku
Indonesian film directors
Indonesian film producers